Sports and Fitness Center is an indoor sporting arena located in Saint Thomas, United States Virgin Islands. The capacity of the arena is 3,500 people (the largest on the island) and is home to the University of the Virgin Islands Buccaneers.  It hosts the United States Virgin Islands Paradise Jam, a pre-season college basketball tournament.

References

Indoor arenas in the United States Virgin Islands
College basketball venues in the United States
Basketball venues in the United States Virgin Islands